De Gooyer is the name of a number of windmills in the Netherlands, including -

De Gooyer, Amsterdam, North Holland
De Gooyer, Wolvega, Friesland